The 2021–22 Omaha Mavericks men's ice hockey season was the 25th season of play for the program. They represented the University of Nebraska Omaha in the 2021–22 NCAA Division I men's ice hockey season and for the 9th season in the National Collegiate Hockey Conference (NCHC). The Mavericks were coached by Mike Gabinet, in his fifth season, and played their home games at Baxter Arena.

Season
Omaha began its season with a tremendous run, winning seven consecutive games during the month of October. The extended winning streak vaulted the Mavericks into a top-10 ranking but it did come with a caveat. All of their early-season matches came against relatively weak non-conference opponents and wouldn't provide much assistance in the team's bid for an NCAA appearance. That didn't seem like much of a problem when Omaha earned a road split with top-ranked St. Cloud State, but the Mavericks didn't help themselves with inconsistent performances against the two worst teams in the NCHC.

After returning from the winter break, Omaha continued their up-and-down play with a split against unranked St. Lawrence that put them in the final potential at-large position. They were forced to postpone their series the following week due to COVID-19 but suffered a greater loss when they were swept by Denver afterwards.

Omaha was unable to arrest its downward slide for a while, splitting three consecutive weekends and then bottoming out with a sweep at the hands of Miami in mid-February. The losses to the RedHawks knocked Omaha out of the polls entirely and made it all but impossible for the team to make the NCAA tournament without a conference championship. While the team finished strong in the final three weeks, Omaha sat mired in 6th place with a losing conference record.

Isaiah Saville remained in goal for the Mavericks as they began postseason play. Omaha managed to gain a lead in the first game and were ahead at the start of the third, however, they were facing one of the top offenses in the country in Western Michigan and the Broncos stormed back with a 3-goal third period to take the match. The second game had a similar pattern with Omaha gaining a 3–1 lead mid-way through the contest, only to see their advantage erased with WMU netted three goals in less than 5 minutes. The Mavs were able to tie the game in the third period but could not get the game-winner and ultimately fell in overtime.

Departures

Recruiting

Roster
As of September 9, 2021.

Standings

Schedule and results

|-
!colspan=12 style=";" | Regular Season

|-
!colspan=12 style=";" | 

|- align="center" bgcolor="#e0e0e0"
|colspan=12|Omaha Lost Series 0–2

Scoring statistics

Goaltending statistics

Rankings

Note: USCHO did not release a poll in week 24.

Players drafted into the NHL

2022 NHL Entry Draft

† incoming freshman

References

2021-22
Omaha Mavericks
Omaha Mavericks
Omaha Mavericks
Omaha Mavericks